Thomas Strunz (born 25 April 1968) is a German former professional footballer who played mostly as a defensive midfielder.

Over the course of 12 seasons, he amassed Bundesliga totals of 235 games and 32 goals, representing in the competition Bayern Munich and Stuttgart. He won 12 major club titles in his career.

Strunz gained 41 caps for Germany in nine years. He was part of the squad that won Euro 1996.

Club career
Born in Duisburg, North Rhine-Westphalia, Strunz started his career playing for hometown club MSV Duisburg, but moved to FC Bayern Munich aged 21. He made his Bundesliga debut on 31 August 1989 in a 4–0 home win against Hamburger SV, and proceeded to score five goals in 20 matches in his first season.

Strunz joined VfB Stuttgart for 1992–93, netting five times in his debut campaign before returning to Bayern after three years. In his two spells with the Bavarian side he won four Bundesliga championship medals and two DFB-Pokals, adding the 1995–96 UEFA Cup in which he scored two goals in nine games. In his last full season his team went on to win the league title but he played rarely due to recurrent injuries. He retired from football after leaving the club in late 2000.

International career
Strunz made his debut for Germany on 10 October 1990, in a 3–1 friendly win in Sweden. He went on to represent the nation at the 1994 FIFA World Cup and the victorious UEFA Euro 1996.

During the latter competition, Strunz appeared in five of six matches (being sent off against Italy and subsequently suspended for the quarter-final), converting his penalty shootout attempt in the semi-finals and playing the entire final against the Czech Republic.

Honours

Club
Bayern Munich
 Bundesliga: 1989–90, 1996–97, 1998–99, 1999–2000
 DFB-Pokal: 1997–98, 1999–2000
 DFB-Ligapokal: 1997, 1998, 2000
 DFL-Supercup: 1990
 UEFA Cup: 1995–96
 UEFA Champions League runner-up: 1998–99

VfB Stuttgart
 DFL-Supercup: 1992

International
Germany
 UEFA European Championship: 1996
 U.S. Cup: 1993

Career Statistics

International

International goal
Scores and results list Germany's goal tally first.

Career after pro times 
After retiring, Strunz served as general manager at VfL Wolfsburg for nearly a year, being fired on 19 December 2005 – head coach Holger Fach was sacked on the same day, and the former was awarded €2.750.000 in compensation. In April 2008 he enrolled in the same capacity at lowly Rot-Weiss Essen, being fired on 12 September of the following year.

Later Strunz worked as football pundit for German TV channel Sport1.

Personal life
Strunz's wife, Claudia, left him for fellow German international Stefan Effenberg.

Trivia 
On 10 March 1998, he was one of the main targets in an infamous press conference held by a furious Bayern manager Giovanni Trapattoni, who addressed the media in broken German. This gave Strunz the possibility to work as a TV pundit after his football career.

References

External links

 
 
 
 

1968 births
Living people
Footballers from Duisburg
German footballers
Association football midfielders
Bundesliga players
MSV Duisburg players
FC Bayern Munich footballers
VfB Stuttgart players
Germany under-21 international footballers
Germany international footballers
1994 FIFA World Cup players
UEFA Euro 1996 players
UEFA European Championship-winning players
UEFA Cup winning players
West German footballers